The West Side School is a school building constructed in Worland, Wyoming in 1936. The school was built by the Works Progress Administration to for the education of Mexican students in the region. The school remained segregated for Mexican students until 1956, in the immediate aftermath of Brown v. Board of Education.

The West Side School was listed on the National Register of Historic Places in 2021.

References

External links
 West Side School at the Wyoming State Historic Preservation Office

National Register of Historic Places in Washakie County, Wyoming
Worland, Wyoming